Parmigiano-Reggiano, or parmesan cheese, is a type of Italian cheese. 

Parmigiano may also refer to:

People
Parmigianino, also called Parmigiano (1503 – 1540), Italian Mannerist painter and printmaker
Fabrizio Parmigiano (1555 – 1629), Italian Baroque painter

Other
From the Province of Parma
Parmigiano dialect of the Emilian language

See also
Parma (disambiguation)
Parmesan (disambiguation)
Parmigiana
Parmo